Love Liberty Disco is the eighth studio album by Christian pop rock band Newsboys, released in 1999. In stark contrast to the band's usual pop rock sound, Love Liberty Disco focuses on 1970s era-inspired sounds and disco.

Track listing

Music videos 

 "Love Liberty Disco"

Radio singles 

"Love Liberty Disco" (1999)
<small>peaked at No. 5 on ''CCMs Christian CHR chart, and later appeared on the WOW 2000 compilation album</small>
"Beautiful Sound" (2000)
Peaked at No. 6 on ''CCMs Christian AC chart, and No. 1 for 2 weeks on the Christian CHR chart. The song also appeared on the WOW Hits 2001 compilation album.</small>
"I Surrender All" / "Good Stuff" (2000)
<small>Released as a double A-side single, with the former geared towards AC radio, and the latter towards the CHR and rock formats. While "I Surrender All" did not chart on any of ''CCMs Christian charts, "Good Stuff" peaked at No. 14 on the Christian Rock chart and No. 1 on the Christian CHR chart.

 Personnel Newsboys Peter Furler – lead vocals, guitars, drums
 Phil Joel – bass, vocals
 Jody Davis – guitars, vocals
 Jeff Frankenstein – keyboards, programming 
 Duncan Phillips – drums, percussion , electronic percussionAdditional musicians Tedd Tjornhom – programming
 Tim Ruther – decks on "Good Stuff"
 Steve Hindalong – guest percussion on "Break"
 Blair Masters – string arrangements
 Nashville String Machine – stringsProduction'''
 Peter Furler – producer 
 Wes Campbell – executive producer
 Lynn Nichols – executive producer
 Shane D. Wilson – recording, mixing
 White House Recording Studio, Nashville, Tennessee – recording location
 Earfull Studios, Franklin, Tennessee – recording location
 Russ Long – additional recording
 Tara Wilson – assistant engineer
 Stephen Marcussen – mastering
 A&M Mastering Studio, Hollywood, California – mastering location
 Christiév Carothers – creative direction
 Jan Cook – art direction
 Dan Harding – album design
 Michael Riuz – photography

References 

1999 albums
Newsboys albums
Sparrow Records albums